The USC Norris Comprehensive Cancer Center is a cancer center owned and operated by the University of Southern California (USC) through its Keck School of Medicine.

Kenneth True Norris Jr. provided the money to build the hospital after voters rejected a bond offering proposed by USC and Los Angeles County; the hospital opened in 1983.

Tenet Healthcare acquired the center in 2003 and sold it, along with Keck Hospital of USC, to USC in 2009 for $275 million after three years of litigation between the parties.

References 

Cancer organizations based in the United States
Keck School of Medicine of USC
Medical research institutes in California
Hospitals in Los Angeles
Hospitals established in 1973
1973 establishments in California
NCI-designated cancer centers